Federation for a Democratic China (FDC ) is a Canada based political group that advocates the democratization of China through opposition of the Chinese Communist Party and the support of human rights. It was founded on September 22, 1989 in Paris, France, following the 1989 Tiananmen Square Protests.

The group has members all over the world, including mainland China. Active members are located in Hong Kong, Taiwan, Canada, the United States, Australia, New Zealand, Britain, France, Germany, Japan, Thailand and in other European and Asian countries.

The group was very active in the five years following the Tiananmen Square protests of 1989 and has been substantially reinvigorated and active since 2003 with large congresses attracting a broad cross-section of leading Chinese Democracy Activists and exiles.

In 2005 Chen Yonglin, then Chinese consulate-general working in Sydney, defected to the Australian government by a formal claim for political asylum. Chen claimed that a network of 1,000 Chinese government spies were operating in Australia, leading the chairman of the Australian branch of the FDC to comment that such claims could "lead to [an] atmosphere of distrust and even antagonism towards the Chinese community."

On October 8, 2012, during the 11th Congress of FDC, Sheng Xue, who lives in Canada was elected as the President of the FDC. She was the first female president of the FDC, and the first female president of any major organization in the overseas Chinese pro-democracy movement.

On March 24, 2017, during the 13th Congress of FDC, Chin Jin, who lives in Australia, was elected as President. Jin Xiuhong of the United States, Sheng Xue of Canada, Wang Dai of Japan and Zhang Jian of France were all elected as Vice-Presidents, and Luo Le from Canada was elected as the Chair of the Supervisory Committee.

Other former Presidents of the FDC include Yan Jiaqi and Wan Runnan, who both lived in France during the FDC's initial stages and later moved to the United States. Wan Runnan currently lives in Paris.

The group had 3000 members at peak. In 2017, the membership was reduced to 100. The group split in 2017.

References

External links
Federation for a Democratic China Official Website
Thoughts on a New Republic
Forum for a Democratic China (Australia)

1989 establishments in France
Chinese democracy movements
Political organizations based in France